Defending champion Iga Świątek defeated Jessica Pegula in the final, 6–3, 6–0 to win the singles tennis title at the 2023 WTA Qatar Open. Światek lost only five games across three matches en route to the title, the record fewest en route to a WTA Tour-level title (breaking Chris Evert's record from 1981).

Seeds 
The top four seeds received a bye into the second round.

Draw

Finals

Top half

Bottom half

Qualifying

Seeds

Qualifiers

Qualifying draw

First qualifier

Second qualifier

Third qualifier

Fourth qualifier

References

External links 
Main draw
Qualifying draw

2023 Qatar Total Open - 1
2023 WTA Tour